Nagesh Bhosale is an Indian film, television and theatre actor. He has worked on the 2018 Hollywood film Hotel Mumbai, alongside Jason Isaacs, Armie Hammer and Dev Patel. Nagesh has acted in more than a hundred Indian films and thousands of episodes in Television shows.
 
In 2014, he founded Ajna Motion Picture Pvt. Ltd., a film production house. Ajna's first film Panhala (2015), directed and produced by Nagesh, is critically acclaimed, won many awards and featured at domestic and foreign film festivals including the 25th Golden Rooster in China. His current film Nati Khel, which is to release in cinemas in 2018 was invited to be screened at the PAMLA conference in Los Angeles, California and is open for dialogue between  filmmakers  the scholarly patrons of PAMLA. It has also won the title of "Film of Special Recommendation" at the Wuhan International Art Film Festival, in China, December 2016. In 2017, it won Special Jury Mention at the Bodhisattva International Film Festival, it also won Best Story & Best Art Direction at Sanskruti Kala Darpan Awards in Mumbai, Best Director at Ottawa International Film Festival in Canada, Best Cinematography & Best Actress in Golden Gate International Film Festival in USA California. It also has been an official selection at Pune International Film Festival, and Orange City International Film Festival.

Recently Bhosale works in marthi film called Piru which is based on love social aspects, directed by Aniket Alandikar. The principal photography starts in 2018 but film didn't release it due to overconfident nature and lack of knowledge about the direction of director.

Filmography
 As an actor 
International movies
 The Warrior Queen of Jhansi (2019)
 Hotel Mumbai (2018)
 Hichyasathi Kay Pan (2018)

 Hindi movies 

 Bombay Boys (1998)
 Shool (1999) as Sudhir Vinod
 Lal Salam (2002)
 Dum (2003 Hindi film) as Jitendra Salvi (Jeetu Bhai) Providend fund Government Officer
 Bardaasht (2004) as Lawyer
 D (2005)
 Sarkar (2005)
 Kyon Ki... (2005)
 Hostel (2007)
 Shiva (2006)
 Billu (2009)
 31st October (2015)
 Awahan (2015)
 Nati Khel (2017)

Marathi movies

 Tu Ka Patil (2018) 
 Jugaad (2016)
 Ganvesh (2015)
 Shasan (2015)
 Panhala (2015)....Balkrishna Guide
 Goshta Choti Dongraevadhi (Nandu)
Nati (2014)
 Dhag (2014)
 Duniyadari (2013)
 Gallit Gondhal Dillit Mujra (Politician/Sarpanch)
 Chingi
 Vishwavinayak
 Punha Gondhal Punha Mujra
 Pyaar Vali Love Story
 Chintu 2
 Chimani Pakhare (2001) 
Premankur (1993) ....Mr.Valture 
 Sata Lota Pan Sagla Khota (2014)

Marathi serials

 Daamini - Marathi Serial (1997)
 Devyani... Ekka Raja Rani
Yek Number (2015)
 Tujya Ishkacha Nadkhula (2021)

As a director
 Goshta Chhoti Dongraevdhi (2009)
 Gallit Gondhal Dillit Mujra (2009)
 Adgula Madgula (2011)
 Panhala (2015)
 Nati Khel (2017)
 Sanchar (2017)

As a producer
After completing endless projects in the Hindi, Marathi and Telugu language fraternity as an actor, he ventured into Directing and Producing. He has successfully made 6 films so far, as a Director. In 2009, his debut film 'Goshta Choti Dongraevadhi' (English title: A story as small as a mountain) was highly appreciated by the critics and audiences at the time. Nagesh's films are enthralling and speak of the contemporary issues in India.

 Awards for Nati Khel

 Awards for Panhala

References

Year of birth missing (living people)
Living people
Male actors in Marathi cinema
Male actors in Hindi cinema
Male actors in Marathi television